Sigismondo is an operatic 'dramma' in two acts by Gioachino Rossini to an Italian libretto by Giuseppe Maria Foppa.

The opera was not a success and Rossini later re-used some of its music in Elisabetta, regina d'Inghilterra, The Barber of Seville, and Adina.

Performance history
Sigismondo was first performed at the Teatro La Fenice, Venice, on 26 December 1814, with revivals in Cremona, Reggio Emilia, Padua and Senigallia (all in 1819), Florence and Siena (both in 1820) and finally in Bologna (1827).

Its modern revival took place in Rovigo in 1992 (see recording details below).

Synopsis
Time: 16th Century
Place: Poland

Roles

Recordings

References
Notes

Sources
Gossett, Philip; Brauner, Patricia (2001), " Sigismondo " in Holden, Amanda (ed.), The New Penguin Opera Guide, New York: Penguin Putnam. 
Osborne, Charles (1994), The Bel Canto Operas of Rossini, Donizetti, and Bellini, London: Methuen; Portland, Oregon: Amadeus Press.  
Osborne, Richard (1998), "Sigismondo", in Stanley Sadie  (Ed.),  The New Grove Dictionary of Opera, Vol. xxxx.  London: Macmillan Publishers, Inc.   
Osborne, Richard (1990), Rossini, Ithaca, New York: Northeastern University Press. 
Osborne, Richard (1998), "Sigismondo", in  Stanley Sadie, (Ed.),  The New Grove Dictionary of Opera, Vol. XXX. pp. XXX   London: Macmillan Publishers, Inc.   
Radiciotti, Giuseppe (1927—1929), Gioacchino Rossini: vita documentata; opere ed influenze su l'arte, 3 vols. Tivoli: Chicca.

External links
 Libretto in Italian  Retrieved 3 December 2012

Operas by Gioachino Rossini
Italian-language operas
Operas
Opera world premieres at La Fenice